The Angolan long-eared bat (Laephotis angolensis) is a species of vesper bat in the Vespertilionidae family. It can be found in moist savanna in Angola and Democratic Republic of the Congo.

Taxonomy and etymology
It was described as a new species in 1935 by Albert Monard. In papers published in 1953 and 1971, the Angolan long-eared bat was treated as a subspecies of De Winton's long-eared bat. However, it is generally treated as a full species at present. It has been suggested that it may be synonymous with Botswanan long-eared bat. Its species name "angolensis" is Latin for "Angolan," likely in reference to the fact that the holotype was encountered near Dala, Angola.

Description
The fur of its back is yellowish- or reddish-brown. Ventral fur is pale gray or cream in color.

Range and habitat
It has only been documented in the Central Zambezian miombo woodlands. Its range includes Angola and the Democratic Republic of the Congo.

Conservation
It is considered a locally rare species. As of 2008, it is assessed as a data deficient species by the IUCN.

References

Laephotis
Mammals described in 1935
Taxonomy articles created by Polbot
Bats of Africa